Pobieda may refer to several places in Ukraine:

Pobieda (urban-type settlement), Donetsk Oblast
Pobieda, Amvrosiivka Raion, Donetsk Oblast
Pobieda, Pokrovsk Raion, Donetsk Oblast
Pobieda, Starobesheve Raion, Donetsk Oblast
Pobieda, Kharkiv Oblast
Pobieda, Luhansk Oblast